Podiasa is a genus of moths of the family Yponomeutidae.

Species
Podiasa chiococcella - Busck, 1900 

Yponomeutidae

Moths by continent